Natalya Aristarkhova (born 31 October 1989) is a Russian middle-distance runner. She competed in the 3000 metres steeplechase event at the 2015 World Championships in Athletics in Beijing, China.

References

External links
 

1989 births
Living people
Place of birth missing (living people)
Russian female middle-distance runners
Russian female steeplechase runners
World Athletics Championships athletes for Russia
Russian Athletics Championships winners